Oceanisphaera aquimarina is a Gram-negative, aerobic and motile bacterium from the genus of Oceanisphaera.

References 

Aeromonadales
Bacteria described in 2016